Bustin' Loose is a studio album released in 1979 by the Washington, D.C.-based go-go band Chuck Brown & the Soul Searchers. The album includes the charting single and one of the all-time classic go-go songs "Bustin' Loose", along with a remake of the classic Jerry Butler's soul ballad "Never Gonna Give You Up" from the 1968 album The Ice Man Cometh.

Bustin' Loose became Brown's first album to chart on the Billboard 200, where it peaked at number 31. On August 10, 1979, Bustin' Loose was certified gold by the Recording Industry Association of America, for shipments of 500,000 copies in the United States. The single "Bustin' Loose" was also certified gold by the RIAA on March 14, 1979.

Track listing

Personnel
 Chuck Brown – lead vocals, electric guitar
 Jerry Wilder – bass guitar, backing vocals
 Gregory Gerran – congas, percussion
 Ricky Wellman – drums
 Leroy Fleming – tenor saxophone, flute, timbales, backing vocals
 Skip Fennell – keyboards
 Curtis Johnson - organ
 John Buchanan – keyboards, trombone, backing vocals
 Donald Tillery – trumpet, tambourine, backing vocals
Leron Young - lead guitar on "Never Gonna Give You Up" and "Could It Be :ove"
Don Renaldo - strings on "Never Gonna Give You Up" and "Could It Be Love"
 Lincoln Ross - trombone on "Bustin' Loose" 
Technical
Logan H. Westbrooks - executive producer
Carl Paruolo - engineer

References

External links
 Bustin' Loose at Discogs.com

1979 albums
Chuck Brown albums
albums recorded at Sigma Sound Studios